The 2013 Outback Bowl was a post-season American college football bowl game, held on January 1, 2013, at Raymond James Stadium in Tampa, Florida, as part of the 2012–13 NCAA Bowl season. It was the 27th edition of the Outback Bowl, named after sponsor Outback Steakhouse, and was telecast at 1:00 p.m. ET on ESPN. It featured the South Carolina Gamecocks from the Southeastern Conference (SEC) versus the Michigan Wolverines from the Big Ten Conference.  South Carolina won, 33–28.

Teams

The Michigan Wolverines and South Carolina Gamecocks had met twice before, in the 1980s, and entered this contest with the series tied at 1-1.

South Carolina

South Carolina entered the game with a 10–2 record, having lost to #14 AP Poll LSU and #9 Florida.

Michigan

Michigan entered the game with an 8–4 record, having lost to #1 AP Poll: Alabama, #4 Notre Dame, #3 Ohio State and #25 Nebraska.

The Hit

"The Hit"
is widely considered to mark the turning point in the game for South Carolina and it earned a "Best Play" ESPY Award for South Carolina's Jadeveon Clowney.

"The Hit" refers to a play by defensive end Jadeveon Clowney which occurred midway during the fourth quarter of play.  After a Wolverines fake punt, followed by a controversial call awarding Michigan a first down during a critical time-consuming drive, Clowney gained instant fame for his tackle of Michigan running back Vincent Smith that came with 8:21 remaining in the fourth quarter. "The Hit" dislodged Smith's helmet and forced a fumble that Clowney himself recovered. "The Hit" set up a touchdown pass to wide receiver Ace Sanders on the next play.  Although "The Hit" itself did not result in the game-winning touchdown, it is considered by many to have motivated a previously lethargic Gamecock offense to rally and ultimately win the game.

Game summary

Scoring summary
Source.

Statistics

References

ReliaQuest Bowl
Outback Bowl
Outback Bowl
21st century in Tampa, Florida
Michigan Wolverines football bowl games
South Carolina Gamecocks football bowl games
January 2013 sports events in the United States